The 1867 Settlement Historic District is an historic district in Texas City, Galveston, Texas.

History 
Several freedmen were cowboys during the civil war, after the war worked the Butler Ranch, and earned money on the Chisholm Trail. They bought land from William Jones, and founded a freedman's neighborhood.

The first settlers were Kneeland and Slyvia Britton, and Albert and Priscilla (Britton) Phillips. Calvin Bell, Thomas Britton and David Hobgood were area Cowboys and pioneers of the community. By 1870, the Rev. Israel S. Campbell helped begin a church; residents built a sanctuary and school the following year. 
The community prospered throughout the late 1800s. Also, the community had a high literacy rate. By the early 1900s residents worked in railroad occupations and later in industry. In 1911, an interurban line came through the community, and Highland Station opened; the Settlement was known as Highlands and La Marque until it was incorporated into the city limits of Texas City in the 1950s. The community began to decline in the 1960s, when many young people left to work in an integrated society. However, rodeos and trail rides have been held as reminders of this once flourishing and self-sufficient community founded by African American Cowboys.

The 1887 Bell home is now a community museum.

References 

Culture of Galveston, Texas
National Register of Historic Places in Galveston County, Texas
Tourist attractions in Galveston, Texas
Historic districts on the National Register of Historic Places in Texas